John Alden Loring (March 31, 1871 – May 8, 1947) was a mammalogist and field naturalist who served with the Bureau of Biological Survey, United States Department of Agriculture, the Bronx Zoological Park, the Smithsonian Institution and numerous expeditions collecting specimens in North America, Europe and Africa. A voluminous and careful traveling collector, Loring was recognized early in his career for 900 specimens collected, prepared and sent to the United States National Museum over a three-month period during an 1898 expedition through Scandinavia and northwestern Europe.

Loring's work and professional relationships spanned several continents focusing on collecting and documenting species of mammals. He served on the Smithsonian-Roosevelt African Expedition (1909–1910) as the Smithsonian specialist designated to preserve small mammals collected during the year-long expedition. In 1916, he was sent as a joint envoy of the New York Zoological Park, Philadelphia Zoological Gardens and the National Zoological Park to South Africa to collect animals and if possible to arrange for a supply of future living specimens.

Loring's personal papers are held by the Smithsonian Institution Archives. His collection of field books are part of the Smithsonian's Field Book Registry.

Loring's rat was named for him (Heller, 1909).

References

Publications
Loring, J. Alden (John Alden). African Adventure Stories. New York, New York. C. Scribner's sons. 1914.
Loring, J. Alden (John Alden), 1871-1947: Young Folks' Nature Field Book (Boston, D. Estes and Co., c1906)

External links

 

1871 births
1947 deaths
American mammalogists
American naturalists
American nature writers
American male non-fiction writers
Smithsonian Institution people
Wildlife Conservation Society people